Tiger Woods PGA Tour 2003 is a sports video game developed by EA Redwood Shores for the Xbox, PlayStation 2 and GameCube versions and Headgate Studios for the Microsoft Windows and Mac OS versions and published by EA Sports for Xbox, PlayStation 2, GameCube, Microsoft Windows, Mac OS.

Reception

Tiger Woods PGA Tour 2003 received "critical acclaim" on the GameCube and PC and "generally favorable" reviews on the PlayStation 2 and Xbox, according to review aggregator Metacritic. GameSpot named PGA Tour 2003 the second-best computer game of November 2002. It was also runner-up for the publication's annual "Best Sports Game on PC" award, which went to Madden NFL 2003.

PGA Tour 2003 was nominated for Computer Gaming Worlds 2002 "Sports Game of the Year" award, which ultimately went to Madden NFL 2003. The editors of Computer Games Magazine named PGA Tour 2003 the seventh-best computer game of 2002, and wrote, "Featuring the best swing interface ever created and the most successful career mode yet implemented, it's the biggest step forward in the genre since Links 386." It was a runner-up for GameSpots annual "Most Improved Sequel on PC" and "Best Traditional Sports Game on Xbox" awards.

References

External links
 

2002 video games
EA Sports games
GameCube games
Golf video games
Tiger Woods video games
Classic Mac OS games
PlayStation 2 games
Sports video games set in the United States
Video games developed in the United States
Video games scored by Burke Trieschmann
Video games set in the United Kingdom
Windows games
Xbox games